Richard Blake Brown (4 January 1902 – 3 November 1968) was a British clergyman, writer, actor, and published author, particularly known for openly writing about homosexuality in his novels, plays, poetry, travel writing, and memoirs .

Early Life and education
Brown was born in Melrose, Massachusetts in Greater Boston on 4 January 1902, to Harold Gilbert Brown and Lillian Studley Knight. Shortly after his birth, his father, of English ancestry, moved with his family to England in 1902 due to his work in developing a system of power-signalling for the London Underground. Brown was educated at Tonbridge and Berkhamsted public schools, and later studied at Magdalene College, Cambridge, from where he graduated in 1923. After graduation he joined The Old Vic as a student actor. After some time he left the theatre and commenced theological studies at St Stephen's House, Oxford. He graduated, and was ordained priest in December 1927 by the Bishop of Portsmouth Neville Lovett.

Clerical career
Upon ordination, Brown was appointed curate at St Mary's Church, Portsea, where he assisted, together with other curates, the vicar Geoffrey Lunt. In March 1928, he wrote to Bishop Lovett expressing his lugubrious mood at St Mary's, noting that the post would not "produce in me the happy and spontaneous zeal and enthusiasm which I could feel in fresh surroundings.". Despite the letter, where he remarked that he was offered a curacy at St Mary's Church in Speldhurst which he was eager to accept, Brown remained in Portsea for a further three years. In 1929, he resigned his holy orders due to his perception on the decline in the church's influence on people. He then focused more on his writings. Nonetheless, he returned to his ordained ministry in 1933 and served in St James' Church, Staveley, while in 1939 he moved to Sidmouth and ministered at the local parish church. In March 1941, he joined the Royal Naval Reserve and became chaplain of HMS Renown when it was commissioned to search for the German battleship Bismarck. After that, he served for as a prison chaplain at Horfield Prison, a post he held until June 1968. During those years he managed to become well-liked by both prisoners and staff and was described as the "prisoners’ friend". He had to relinquish his duties at the prison in January 1968 due to poor health and officially retired in June of that year. In October 1941, he announced his engagement to Bridget Lilias Margaret Hancock.

Death
Brown lived in Carters Building in Portland Street, Clifton, Bristol. Towards the end of his life he was quite ill and suffered from diabetes. On 3 November 1968 he was found unconscious on his smoke-filled bedroom floor after a fire had started as a result of an electric heater which had tilted over. Efforts were made to revive him, however he died of Asphyxia at the Bristol Royal Infirmary.

Writer
Brown was the author of a significant amount of literature, some of which was published. Notably, 14 of his novels were published between 1931 and 1959. Some of his unpublished work also includes plays, poetry, travel journals, non-fiction, and short stories. He has also been described as a "Firbankian" novelist, due to the potential influence from the works of Ronald Firbank. Nonetheless, in 1951 Brown wrote that although he enjoyed the work of Firbank, he was weary to call his own work as such due to his unique vivid imagination that differs from Firbank's.

Published books
Miss Higgs and her Silver Flamingo (1931)
Yellow Brimstone (1931)
The Apology of a Young Ex-Parson (1932)
A Broth of a Boy (1934)
The Blank Cheque (1934)
Joy in Jeopardy (1935)
Rococo Coffin (1936)
My Aunt in Pink (1936)
Spinsters, Awake! (1937)
Bicycle Belle (1937)
God by Lamplight (1938)
Mr. Prune on Cotswold (1938)
Yet Trouble Came (1957)
Bright Glades (1959)

Sexuality
Ahead of his time, Brown was quite open about his homosexuality in his writings, notably his autobiographical works. Brown kept a diary where he recounts how in 1927 he discussed homosexual sex with his father and how he confessed everything to his father concerning his sexuality. It was noted that he stored his diaries in a locked chest, within another locked chest.

References

1902 births
1968 deaths
20th-century Church of England clergy
Anglican writers
People from Melrose, Massachusetts
Alumni of Magdalene College, Cambridge
British gay writers
British male novelists
Gay novelists
20th-century British novelists
20th-century English male writers
British LGBT novelists